Coronavirus, Explained is an American documentary limited series produced by Vox. The series, along with The Mind, Explained and Sex, Explained, is a spin-off of the television series Explained. Episodes of the show explore various topics around the subject of the COVID-19 pandemic, exploring the efforts to stop it. The series premiered on Netflix on April 26, 2020. The series is narrated by J. K. Simmons, Laura Linney and Idris Elba

Episodes

Production

Filming 
Vox Media planned to have ten weeks to work on each episode; however, the first episode was rushed to be released in two-and-a-half weeks due to the prevalence of the COVID-19 pandemic. They had already interviewed Bill Gates for an episode in season 2 of Explained called "The Next Pandemic" before the pandemic began, and Vox Media ended up using some of that footage for their first episode.

Release 
The trailer for the mini-series was released on April 22, 2020. The first episode was released on April 26, 2020, with the second and third episode being released on June 16, 2020.

References

External links

2020 American television series debuts
2020 American television series endings
2020s American documentary television series
American television spin-offs
English-language Netflix original programming
Netflix original documentary television series
Television shows about the COVID-19 pandemic
Vox Media